The Obscene Publications Act (OPA) 1964 is a short piece of English legislation providing minor additional provisions in addition to the Obscene Publications Act 1959, which is the primary statute in this area.

The OPA 1964 was specifically designed to strengthen the law around obscenity, particularly regarding the production of obscene articles for sale and the materials used in the production of obscene articles.

See also
 Obscene Publications Act 1959
 Censorship in the United Kingdom

References

External links

Obscenity law
United Kingdom pornography law
United Kingdom Acts of Parliament 1964